The list of cancelled Super NES and Super Famicom games has those which had been announced and then cancelled or postponed indefinitely by developers or publishers. The original market timeframe of the Super NES and Super Famicom was the early 1990s.

References

 
Super Nintendo Entertainment System games
Super Nintendo Entertainment System